Manila Grey (stylized as MANILA GREY) are a Canadian R&B duo from Vancouver, British Columbia. They are most noted for receiving a Juno Award nomination for Breakthrough Group of the Year at the Juno Awards of 2021.

Consisting of Filipino Canadian musicians Ghostride Neeko and Blame Soliven, they formed in 2016. Their debut EP, No Saints Under Palm Shade, was released in 2017, and was followed by the full-length album No Saints Loading in 2019. In 2020, they released the singles "Shibuya" and "Blue Vegeta", both previews of their forthcoming second album No Saints on Knight Street which was subsequently released on March 26, 2021.

Career 
Manila Grey formed in early 2016 and released their first single "1z" on October 2, 2016, produced by long-time collaborator Azel North.

Discography

Studio albums
2019: No Saints Loading
2020: No Saints Loading (slowed + reverb)
2021: No Saints on Knight Street

EPs
2017: No Saints Under Palm Shade
2022: Spirits

References

Canadian contemporary R&B musical groups
Canadian musicians of Filipino descent
Musical groups from Vancouver
Musical groups established in 2016
2016 establishments in British Columbia